hReview is a microformat for publishing reviews of books, music, films, restaurants, businesses, holidays, etc. using (X)HTML on web pages, using HTML classes and rel attributes.

On 12 May 2009, Google announced that they would be parsing the hReview, hCard and hProduct microformats, and using them to populate search result pages.

References

External links
 hReview at the Microformats Wiki

Microformats